A Place Where There's No More Pain is the fifth studio album by American alternative metal band Life of Agony. The album, the band's first studio release since 2005's Broken Valley, was released on April 28, 2017 through Napalm Records.

This is the band's last release with drummer Sal Abruscato, who would depart from the band for a second time later that year in December.

Track listing

Charts

Personnel
Life of Agony
Mina Caputo – vocals
Joey Z. – guitar
Alan Robert – bass, art direction
Sal Abruscato – drums

Production
Produced and mixed by Matt Brown and Life of Agony
Mastered by Ted Jensen

References

2017 albums
Life of Agony albums
Napalm Records albums